Eugène Albert Athanase Callay (born February 21, 1822 in Montcornet, Aisne and died in LeChesne, Ardennes March 24, 1896) was a French pharmacist and amateur botanist who worked on classifying the flora of the department of the Ardennes.

References 

1822 births
1896 deaths
19th-century French botanists